Kayabağ is a village in the Pertek District, Tunceli Province, Turkey. The village is populated by Kurds of the Pilvenk tribe and had a population of 73 in 2021.

The hamlets of Bozdoğan and Elecik are attached to the village.

References 

Kurdish settlements in Tunceli Province
Villages in Pertek District